Operation Montgomery Rendezvous was a security operation during the Vietnam war conducted by the 101st Airborne Division in the area southwest of Huế in western Thừa Thiên Province, from 8 June to 15 August 1969.

Background
Following the conclusion of Operation Apache Snow, the 101st Airborne Division continued operations in the same general area to interdict People’s Army of Vietnam (PAVN) infiltration routes and attack their bases in order to forestall attacks on Huế.

Operation
On the early morning of 14 June the Brigade command post at Firebase Berchtesgaden was attacked by sappers resulting in 12 US killed and 33 PAVN killed and 3 captured. On 15 June sappers attacked Firebase Currahee resulting in 54 PAVN killed. The 3rd Battalion, 5th Cavalry Regiment began armored cavalry operations in the A Sầu Valley on 20 June, but contact continued to be sporadic with the PAVN forces avoiding engagement. On 28 June the Army of the Republic of Vietnam (ARVN) 4th Battalion, 1st Regiment observed a large force of PAVN moving south in the open near Firebase O'Reilly and called in airstrikes which killed 37 PAVN.

On 11 July the 1st Battalion, 506th Infantry Regiment assaulted an entrenched PAVN position on Hill 996 in the western A Sầu Valley, losing 16 killed, including the battalion commander, Lieutenant Colonel Arnold Hayward; PAVN losses were ten killed. Sergeant Gordon Ray Roberts would be awarded the Medal of Honor for his actions during the battle.

Accompanying helicopter gunships fired on the positions, and the air assault was completed one hour later. One PAVN soldier was killed, and one individual weapon captured.
On 20 July at 16:30 an element of the 3rd Brigade engaged a PAVN force  of Huế. The fighting continued until 19:30 when the PAVN withdrew leaving 3 dead, US losses were 2 killed.

They apparently were killed two months previously by small arms fire. 

They apparently were killed three weeks previously. 
The troopers defended with unit weapons, including tank guns, and were supported by a USAF AC-47 Spooky gunship. The PAVN withdrew leaving nine dead, four individual and two crew-served weapons.

The troopers fought back with unit weapons until 08:15 when the PAVN withdrew, leaving two dead and one individual weapon. US casualties were one killed. 

The PAVN withdrew, leaving 11 dead. The PAVN withdrew leaving one dead and one individual weapon. U.S. casualties were five killed. 

The infantrymen fought back with unit weapons, and after a 20-minute fire-fight the PAVN withdrew leaving five dead and four individual and one crew-served weapon. A later sweep of the area found six graves of PAVN apparently killed by airstrikes two days previously.

Aftermath
The operation ended on 15 August 1969. PAVN losses were 393 killed and 174 individual and 47 crew-served weapons captured. US losses were 87 killed.

References

1969 in Vietnam
Montgomery Rendezvous
Battles and operations of the Vietnam War in 1969
History of Thừa Thiên Huế province